Iván Mándy (23 December 1918 in Budapest – 6 October 1995 in Budapest) was a Hungarian writer.

Biography
From 1945 on Mándy worked at the literary revue Újhold. After the Stalinist takeover he became a freelance writer. In 1989 he got again the chance to write for a literary newspaper. He was promoted as a candidate for the Nobel Prize in Literature in 1993 by the Hungarian Academy of Fine Arts.

He died in 1995 in Budapest.

External links
 Iván Mándy: On the balcony - Selected short stories

Hungarian writers
1918 births
1995 deaths
Hungarian children's writers